Events in the year 1162 in Norway.

Incumbents
Monarch: Magnus V Erlingsson (along with Haakon II Sigurdsson)

Events
7 July - .

Arts and literature

Births

Deaths
7 July – Haakon II of Norway, King (born c. 1147).

References

Norway